Breslaw was a  74-gun ship of the line of the French Navy.

Career 
Ordered as Superbe, the ship took her name of Breslaw on 14 May 1807, to commemorate the capture of the city of Wrocław by Jérôme Bonaparte on 7 January. She was commissioned on 9 August 1808 under Captain Joseph Allemand and appointed to the Toulon squadron. She departed Genoa for Toulon on 20 January 1809, along with the corvette Victorieuse; the ships crossed safely, arriving on 26, but collided off the harbour.

Refitted in 1824, Breslaw later took part in the Battle of Navarino, on 20 October 1827. She played a decisive role in the battle when her captain, La Bretonnière, took the initiative of leaving the French squadron, which had safely completed its objectives, to reinforce HMS Albion, which was trapped and in danger of being overwhelmed by the Ottoman fleet.

Breslaw took part in the Invasion of Algiers in 1830 under Captain Maillard de Liscourt, notably landing troops at Sidi Ferruch on 16 June.

Refitted again in 1831, Breslaw was struck in 1837.

Notes, citations, and references

Notes

Citations

References
 

 Woodhouse, Christopher Montague (1965), The Battle of Navarino

Ships of the line of the French Navy
Téméraire-class ships of the line
1808 ships